Titan IV was a family of heavy-lift space launch vehicles developed by Martin Marietta and operated by the United States Air Force from 1989 to 2005. Launches were conducted from Cape Canaveral Air Force Station, Florida and Vandenberg Air Force Base, California.

The Titan IV was the last of the Titan family of rockets, originally developed by the Glenn L. Martin Company in 1958. It was retired in 2005 due to their high cost of operation and concerns over its toxic  hypergolic propellants, and replaced with the Atlas V and Delta IV launch vehicles under the EELV program. The final launch (B-30) from Cape Canaveral occurred on 29 April 2005, and the final launch from Vandenberg AFB occurred on 19 October 2005. Lockheed Martin Space Systems built the Titan IVs near Denver, Colorado, under contract to the US government.

Two Titan IV vehicles are currently on display at the National Museum of the United States Air Force in Dayton, Ohio and the Evergreen Aviation and Space Museum in McMinnville, Oregon.

Vehicle description
The Titan IV was developed to provide assured capability to launch Space Shuttle–class payloads for the Air Force. The Titan IV could be launched with no upper stage, the Inertial Upper Stage (IUS), or the Centaur upper stage.

The Titan IV was made up of two large solid-fuel rocket boosters and a two-stage liquid-fueled core. The two storable liquid fuel core stages used Aerozine 50 fuel and nitrogen tetroxide oxidizer. These propellants are hypergolic (ignite on contact) and are liquids at room temperature, so no tank insulation is needed. This allowed the launcher to be stored in a ready state for extended periods, but both propellants are extremely toxic.

The Titan IV could be launched from either coast: SLC-40 or 41 at Cape Canaveral Air Force Station near Cocoa Beach, Florida and at SLC-4E, at Vandenberg Air Force Base launch sites 55 miles northwest of Santa Barbara California. Launches to polar orbits occurred from Vandenberg, with most other launches taking place at Cape Canaveral.

Titan IV-A
Titan IV-A flew with steel-cased solid UA1207 rocket motors (SRMs) produced by Chemical Systems Division.

Titan IV-B
The Titan IV-B evolved from the Titan III family and was similar to the Titan 34D.

While the launcher family had an extremely good reliability record in its first two decades, this changed in the 1980s with the loss of a Titan 34D in 1985 followed by the disastrous explosion of another in 1986 due to a SRM failure.
Due to this, the Titan IV-B vehicle was intended to use the new composite-casing Upgraded Solid Rocket Motors. Due to development problems the first few Titan IV-B launches flew with the old-style UA1207 SRMs.

General characteristics
 Builder: Lockheed-Martin Astronautics
 Power Plant:
 Stage 0 consisted of two solid-rocket motors.
 Stage 1 used an LR87-AJ-11 liquid-propellant rocket engine.
 Stage 2 used the LR91-AJ-11 liquid-propellant engine.
 Optional upper stages included the Centaur and Inertial Upper Stage.
 Guidance System: A ring laser gyro guidance system manufactured by Honeywell.
 Thrust:
 Stage 0: Solid rocket motors provided 1.7 million pounds force (7.56 MN) per motor at liftoff.
 Stage 1: LR87-AJ-11 provided an average of 548,000 pounds force (2.44 MN)
 Stage 2: LR91-AJ-11 provided an average of 105,000 pounds force (467 kN).
 Optional Centaur (RL10A-3-3A) upper stage provided 33,100 pounds force (147 kN) and the Inertial Upper Stage provided up to 41,500 pounds force (185 kN).
 Length: Up to 
 Lift Capability:
 Could carry up to  into low Earth orbit
 up to  into a geosynchronous orbit when launched from Cape Canaveral AFS, Fla.;
 and up to  into a low Earth polar orbit when launched from Vandenberg AFB.
 into geosynchronous orbit:
 with Centaur upper stage 
 with Inertial Upper Stage 
 Payload fairing:
 Manufacturer: McDonnell Douglas Space Systems Co
 Diameter: 
 Length: 56, 66, 76, or 86 ft
 Mass: 11,000, 12,000, 13,000, or 14,000 lb
 Design: 3 sections, isogrid structure, Aluminum
 Maximum Takeoff Weight: Approximately 2.2 million pounds (1,000,000 kg)
 Cost: Approximately $250–350 million, depending on launch configuration.
 Date deployed: June 1989
 Launch sites: Cape Canaveral AFS, Fla., and Vandenberg AFB, Calif.

Upgrades

Solid Rocket Motor Upgrade test stand
In 1988–89, The R. M. Parsons Company designed and built a full-scale steel tower and deflector facility, which was used to test the Titan IV Solid Rocket Motor Upgrade (SRMU).  The launch and the effect of the SRMU thrust force on the Titan IV vehicle were modeled.  To evaluate the magnitude of the thrust force, the SRMU was connected to the steel tower through load measurement systems and launched in-place.  It was the first full-scale test conducted to simulate the effects of the SRMU on the Titan IV vehicle.

Proposed aluminum-lithium tanks
In the early 1980s, General Dynamics developed a plan to assemble a lunar landing spacecraft in-orbit. A Space Shuttle would lift a Lunar Module into orbit and then a Titan IV rocket would launch with an Apollo-type Service Module to rendezvous and dock. The plan required upgrading the Space Shuttle and Titan IV to use lighter aluminium-lithium alloy propellant tanks. The plan never came to fruition, but in the 1990s the Shuttle was converted to aluminum-lithium tanks to rendezvous with the highly inclined orbit of the Russian Mir Space Station.

Type identification 
The IV A (40nA) used boosters with steel casings, the IV B (40nB) used boosters with composite casings (the SRMU).

Type 401 used a Centaur 3rd stage, type 402 used an IUS 3rd stage. The other 3 types (without 3rd stages) were 403, 404, and 405:

 Type 403 featured no upper stage, for lower-mass payloads to higher orbits from Vandenberg.
 Type 404 featured no upper stage, for heavier payloads to low orbits, from Vandenberg.
 Type 405 featured no upper stage, for lower-mass payloads to higher-orbit from Cape Canaveral.

History

The Titan rocket family was established in October 1955 when the Air Force awarded the Glenn L. Martin Company (later Martin-Marietta, now part of Lockheed Martin) a contract to build an intercontinental ballistic missile (SM-68). The resulting Titan I was the nation's first two-stage ICBM and complemented the Atlas ICBM as the second underground, vertically stored, silo-based ICBM. Both stages of the Titan I used liquid oxygen and RP-1 as propellants.

A subsequent version of the Titan family, the Titan II, was a two-stage evolution of the Titan I, but was much more powerful and used different propellants. Designated as LGM-25C, the Titan II was the largest missile developed for the USAF at that time. The Titan II had newly developed engines which used Aerozine 50 and nitrogen tetroxide as fuel and oxidizer in a self-igniting, hypergolic propellant combination, allowing the Titan II to be stored underground ready to launch. Titan II was the first Titan vehicle to be used as a space launcher.

Development of the space launch only Titan III began in 1964, resulting in the Titan IIIA, eventually followed by the Titan IV-A and IV-B.

CELV
By the mid-1980s the United States government worried that the Space Shuttle, designed to launch all American payloads and replace all unmanned rockets, would not be reliable enough for military and classified missions. In 1984 Under Secretary of the Air Force and Director of the National Reconnaissance Office (NRO) Pete Aldridge decided to purchase Complementary Expendable Launch Vehicles (CELV) for ten NRO payloads; the name came from the government's expectation that the rockets would "complement" the shuttle. Later renamed Titan IV, the rocket would only carry three military payloads paired with Centaur stages and fly exclusively from LC-41 at Cape Canaveral. However, the Challenger accident in 1986 caused a renewed dependence on expendable launch systems, with the Titan IV program significantly expanded. At the time of its introduction, the Titan IV was the largest and most capable expendable launch vehicle used by the USAF.

The post-Challenger program added Titan IV versions with the Inertial Upper Stage (IUS) or no upper stages, increased the number of flights, and converted LC-40 at the Cape for Titan IV launches. As of 1991, almost forty total Titan IV launches were scheduled and a new, improved SRM (solid rocket motor) casing using lightweight composite materials was introduced.

Program cost
In 1990, the Titan IV Selected Acquisition Report estimated the total cost for the acquisition of 65 Titan IV vehicles over a period of 16 years to US$18.3 billion (inflation-adjusted US$  billion in ).

Cassini–Huygens launch
In October 1997, a Titan IV-B rocket launched Cassini–Huygens, a pair of probes sent to Saturn. It was the only use of a Titan IV for a non-Department of Defense launch. Huygens landed on Titan on January 14, 2005. Cassini remained in orbit around Saturn. The Cassini Mission ended on September 15, 2017, when the spacecraft was sent into Saturn's atmosphere to burn up.

Retirement
While an improvement over the shuttle, the Titan IV was expensive and unreliable. By the 1990s, there were also growing safety concerns over its toxic propellants. The Evolved Expendable Launch Vehicle (EELV) program resulted in the development of the Atlas V, Delta IV, and Delta IV Heavy launch vehicles, which replaced Titan IV and a number of other legacy launch systems. The new EELVs eliminated the use of hypergolic propellants, reduced costs, and were much more versatile than the legacy vehicles.

Surviving examples
In 2014, the National Museum of the United States Air Force in Dayton, Ohio, began a project to restore a Titan IV-B rocket. This effort was successful, with the display opening June 8, 2016. The only other surviving Titan IV components are at the Wings Over the Rockies Air and Space Museum in Denver, Colorado which has two Titan Stage 1 engines, one Titan Stage 2 engine, and the interstage ‘skirt’ on outdoor display; and at the Evergreen Aviation and Space Museum in McMinnville, Oregon, including the core stages and parts of the solid rocket motor assembly.

Launch history

Launch failures
The Titan IV experienced four catastrophic launch failures.

1993 booster explosion

On August 2, 1993, Titan IV K-11 lifted from SLC-4E carrying a NOSS SIGNIT satellite. Unusually for DoD launches, the Air Force invited civilian press to cover the launch, which became more of a story than intended when the booster exploded 101 seconds after liftoff. Investigation found that one of the two SRMs had burned through, resulting in the destruction of the vehicle in a similar manner as the earlier 34D-9 failure. An investigation found that an improper repair job was the cause of the accident.

After Titan 34D-9, extensive measures had been put in place to ensure proper SRM operating condition, including X-raying the motor segments during prelaunch checks. The SRMs that went onto K-11 had originally been shipped to Cape Canaveral, where X-rays revealed anomalies in the solid propellant mixture in one segment. The defective area was removed by a pie-shaped cut in the propellant block. However, most of CSD's qualified personnel had left the program by this point and so the repair crew in question did not know the proper procedure. After replacement, they neglected to seal the area where the cut in the propellant block had been made. Post repair X-rays were enough for CC personnel to disqualify the SRMs from flight, but the SRMs were then shipped to Vandenberg and approved anyway. The result was a near-repeat of 34D-9; a gap was left between the propellant and SRM casing and another burn-through occurred during launch.

1998 IV-A electrical failure
1998 saw the failure of Titan K-17 with a Navy ELINT Mercury (satellite) from Cape Canaveral around 40 seconds into the flight. K-17 was several years old and the last Titan IV-A to be launched. The post-accident investigation showed that the booster had dozens of damaged or chafed wires and should never have been launched in that operating condition, but the Air Force had put extreme pressure on launch crews to meet program deadlines. The Titan's fuselage was filled with numerous sharp metal protrusions that made it nearly impossible to install, adjust, or remove wiring without it getting damaged. Quality control at Lockheed's Denver plant, where Titan vehicles were assembled, was described as "awful".

The proximal cause of the failure was an electrical short that caused a momentary power dropout to the guidance computer at T+39 seconds. After power was restored, the computer sent a spurious pitch down and yaw to the right command. At T+40 seconds, the Titan was traveling at near supersonic speed and could not handle this action without suffering a structural failure. The sudden pitch downward and resulting aerodynamic stress caused one of the SRMs to separate. The ISDS (Inadvertent Separation Destruct System) automatically triggered, rupturing the SRM and taking the rest of the launch vehicle with it. At T+45 seconds, the Range Safety Officer sent the destruct command to ensure any remaining large pieces of the booster were broken up.

An extensive recovery effort was launched, both to diagnose the cause of the accident and recover debris from the classified satellite. All of the debris from the Titan had impacted offshore, between three and five miles downrange, and at least 30% of the booster was recovered from the sea floor. Debris continued to wash ashore for days afterward, and the salvage operation continued until October 15.

The Air Force had pushed for a "launch on demand" program for DOD payloads, something that was almost impossible to pull off especially given the lengthy preparation and processing time needed for a Titan IV launch (at least 60 days). Shortly before retiring in 1994, General Chuck Horner referred to the Titan program as "a nightmare". The 1998-99 schedule had called for four launches in less than 12 months. The first of these was Titan K-25 which successfully orbited an Orion SIGNIT satellite on May 9, 1998. The second was the K-17 failure, and the third was the K-32 failure.

Stage failure to separate
After a delay caused by the investigation of the previous failure, the 9 April 1999 launch of K-32 carried a DSP early warning satellite. The IUS second stage failed to separate, leaving the payload in a useless orbit. Investigation into this failure found that wiring harnesses in the IUS had been wrapped too tightly with electrical tape so that a plug failed to disconnect properly and prevented the two IUS stages from separating.

Programming error
The fourth launch was K-26 on April 30, 1999, carrying a Milstar communications satellite. During the Centaur coast phase flight, the roll control thrusters fired open-loop until the RCS fuel was depleted, causing the upper stage and payload to rotate rapidly. On restart, the Centaur cartwheeled out of control and left its payload in a useless orbit. This failure was found to be the result of an incorrectly programmed equation in the guidance computer. The error caused the roll rate gyro data to be ignored by the flight computer.

See also
 Comparison of heavy lift launch systems
 List of Titan launches, Titan I, II, III & IV

References

External links

 USAF Titan IVB Fact Sheet
 Titan IV Ignition Videos
 Cassini Huygens Aboard a Titan IV-B Launch Videos
 Early Lunar Access

Lockheed Martin
2005 in spaceflight
Titan (rocket family)